Glutaryl-CoA dehydrogenase (non-decarboxylating) (GDHDes, nondecarboxylating glutaryl-coenzyme A dehydrogenase, nondecarboxylating glutaconyl-coenzyme A-forming GDH) is an enzyme with systematic name glutaryl-CoA:acceptor 2,3-oxidoreductase (non-decarboxylating). This enzyme catalyses the following chemical reaction

 glutaryl-CoA + acceptor  (E)-glutaconyl-CoA + reduced acceptor

The enzyme contains FAD.

References

External links 
 

EC 1.3.99